Nazi (also Romanized as Nāzī; also known as Nāzīābād) is a village in Bazoft Rural District, Bazoft District, Kuhrang County, Chaharmahal and Bakhtiari Province, Iran. According to the 2006 census, its population was 41, in 9 families. The village is populated by ethnic Lurs.

References 

Populated places in Kuhrang County
Luri settlements in Chaharmahal and Bakhtiari Province